Ginevra degli Almieri is a 1935 Italian historical drama film directed by Guido Brignone and starring Elsa Merlini, Amedeo Nazzari and Uberto Palmarini.  Merlini had spotted Nazzari during a stage play, and lobbied for his casting in his film debut. Nazzari went on to be a leading star of Italian cinema. It is set in Florence in the fifteenth century.

Partial cast
 Elsa Merlini as Ginevra Degli Almieri  
 Amedeo Nazzari as Antonio Rondinelli 
 Uberto Palmarini as Padre di Ginevra 
 Ugo Ceseri as Francesco Agolanti  
 Guido Riccioli as Il Burchiello  
 Maurizio D'Ancora as Paolino  
 Ermanno Roveri as Menicuccio 
 Tina Lattanzi as Dianora 
 Luigi Almirante as Il notaro

References

Bibliography 
 Gundle, Stephen. Mussolini's Dream Factory: Film Stardom in Fascist Italy. Berghahn Books, 2013.

External links 
 

1935 films
Italian historical drama films
Italian black-and-white films
1930s historical drama films
1930s Italian-language films
Films directed by Guido Brignone
Films set in Florence
Films set in the 15th century
1935 drama films
1930s Italian films